Wang Yanping (born 22 November 1993) is a Paralympic athlete from China who competes in throwing events for F37 classification athletes.

Athletic career
Wang became involved in sport in 2005. Her first major international games was the 2011 IPC Athletics World Championships in Christchurch. She entered the 100m, 200m and 400m sprints, her best result being fourth place in the 400 m race. A year later she competed at the 2012 Summer Paralympics in London where she won bronze in the 100m T46 sprint. As well as her Paralympic success, Wang has won medals at the 2015 World Championships in Doha, with a bronze in the 100m T47, and a dominant display in the 2014 Asian Para Games where she took gold in all three events entered: 100m, 200m and long jump.

Personal career
Wang was born in Baoshan, China in 1993. An accident at the age of three resulted in her right hand being amputated.

References

1993 births
Paralympic athletes of China
Paralympic bronze medalists for China
Living people
Chinese female sprinters
Chinese female long jumpers
Medalists at the 2012 Summer Paralympics
Athletes (track and field) at the 2012 Summer Paralympics
People from Baoshan, Yunnan
Runners from Yunnan
Paralympic medalists in athletics (track and field)
21st-century Chinese women